The androgen backdoor pathway is a collective name for all metabolic pathways where clinically relevant androgens are synthesized with roundabout of testosterone as an intermediate product. Initially described as pathway where 5α-reduction of 17α-hydroxyprogesterone ultimately leads to 5α-dihydrotestosterone, several other pathways have been since then discovered that lead to 11-oxyandrogens which are potent agonists of the androgen receptors. A backdoor pathway is an alternative to the conventional, canonical androgenic pathway that involves testosterone.

Dihydrotestosterone
The primary feature of the androgen backdoor pathway is that 17α-hydroxyprogesterone (17-OHP) can be 5α-reduced and finally converted to 5α-dihydrotestosterone (DHT) via an alternative route that bypasses the conventional intermediates androstenedione and testosterone.

In mammals, this route is activated during normal prenatal development and leads to early male sexual differentiation. It was first described in the marsupials and later confirmed in humans.

In 21-hydroxylase deficiency or cytochrome P450 oxidoreductase deficiency, this route may be activated regardless of age and sex by even a mild increase in circulating 17-OHP levels.

The first step of this route is 5α-reduction of 17-OHP by SRD5A1/SRD5A2 enzymes to 5α-pregnan-17α-ol-3,20-dione. The next two intermediate products are 5α-pregnane-3α,17α-diol-20-one and androsterone. The final step is conversion of 5α-androstane-3α,17β-diol (androstanediol) to DHT by several 3α-oxidoreductases (HSD17B6, RDH16, etc.). Hence, androstanediol is a marker of the backdoor pathway of DHT synthesis.

Therefore, the pathway can be outlined as 17-OHP → 5α-pregnan-17α-ol-3,20-dione → 5α-pregnane-3α,17α-diol-20-one → androsterone → androstanediol → DHT.

11-Oxyandrogens
Another feature of the backdoor pathway is production of 11-oxygenated (oxygen atom on C11 position forms a ketone group) 19-carbon steroids, also termed 11-oxyandrogens: 11-ketotestosterone and 11-ketodihydrotestosterone, which are 11-keto forms of testosterone and DHT, respectively. The synthesis of 11-oxyandrogens in this pathway does not require testosterone or DHT as intermediate products. 11-oxyandrogens are potent and clinically relevant agonists of the androgen receptors. Potency of 11-ketotestosterone is similar to that of testosterone. 11-ketotestosterone may serve as the main androgen for healthy women.

11-oxyandrogens may be produced in physiologic quantities in healthy organisms, and in excessive quantities in the pathological conditions like 21-hydroxylase deficiency, polycystic ovary syndrome, benign prostatic hyperplasia in prostate cancer and disorders of sex development in neonates and in children.

In 21-hydroxylase deficiency, the steroid 11β-hydroxylase (11βOH) enzyme, also known is CYP11B1, stays at the initial step of 11-oxyandrogen production.

There are several routes that may lead to production of 11-oxyandrogens:
 17-OHP is converted by 11βOH to 21-deoxycortisol, which is subsequently converted to 11-ketotestosterone and 11-ketodihydrotestosterone. 
 Progesterone is converted by 11βOH to 11β-hydroxyprogesterone. There are multiple studies conducted since 1987 that demonstrate increased levels of 11β-hydroxyprogesterone in congenital adrenal hyperplasia. In vitro studies predict that excess of 11β-hydroxyprogesterone may ultimately leads to production of 11-ketodihydrotestosterone and 11-ketoandrosterone. 
 Androstenedione is converted by 11βOH to 11β-hydroxyandrostenedione and then to 11-ketotestosterone and 11-ketodihydrotestosterone.

Clinical significance
Unlike testosterone and androstenedione, androgens produced by the backdoor pathway, i.e. DHT and 11-oxyandrogens, cannot be converted by aromatase into estrogens.

The backdoor pathway is not always considered in the clinical evaluation of patients with hyperandrogenism. Ignoring this pathway may lead to diagnostic pitfalls and confusion, for example, in late onset congenital adrenal hyperplasia, where testosterone levels may be normal amid the symptoms of hyperandrogenism like hirsutism and acne.

History
In April 1987, Benjamin Eckstein and colleagues reported that androstanediol, a direct precursor to DHT, is synthesized in immature rat testes in a pathway that predominantly involves 17-OHP but not androstenedione as an intermediate.

In October 2000, Geoffrey Shaw and colleagues demonstrated that prostate formation in a marsupial (tammar wallaby pouch young) was mediated by the testicular androgen androstanediol, which is higher in male than in female plasma during early sexual differentiation, identifying it as a key hormone in male development. They have shown that androstanediol acts in target tissues via DHT, i.e. is converted to DHT in target tissues, so that testosterone is not the only source of DHT.

In February 2003, Jean Wilson and colleagues described that DHT, a 5α-reduced androgen, can be synthesized from 17-OHP by two pathways: with and without testosterone as an intermediate. They have demonstrated that androstanediol, a precursor to DHT, is formed in the testes of tammar wallaby pouch young with 5α-pregnane-3α,17α-diol-20-one and androsterone as intermediates.

In July 2004, Mala Mahendroo and colleagues described that androstanediol is the predominant androgen in immature mouse testes, and that it is formed by two pathways; the main one involves testosterone, and a second utilizes the pathway progesterone → 5α-dihydroprogesterone → 5α-pregnane-3α-ol-20-one (allopregnanolone) → 5α-pregnane-3α,17α-diol-20-one → androsterone → androstanediol.

In November 2004, Richard Auchus coined the term "backdoor pathway" in a review called "The backdoor pathway to dihydrotestosterone". He defined the backdoor pathway as a "route to DHT that does not involve the testosterone intermediate". He emphasized that this alternative pathway seems to explain how potent androgens are produced under certain normal and pathological conditions when the conventional androgen biosynthetic pathway cannot fully explain the observed consequences.

See also
Late onset congenital adrenal hyperplasia
Congenital adrenal hyperplasia due to 21-hydroxylase deficiency

References

Metabolic pathways